Pivdennyi Seaport (prior to 2017 it was named: Yuzhnyi) is a commercial seaport in the Ukrainian city of Yuzhne near Odesa, on the Black Sea coast.

It is the largest and most profitable port of Ukraine. According to the American Association of Port Authorities it was ranked the 91st (48,582 thousand tons) in 2015 in terms of total cargo turnover among the world's ports. According to the Law of Ukraine "On Seaports of Ukraine," the functions of the seaport administration are performed by the Southern branch of the state enterprise of the Ukrainian Sea Ports Authority.

History
Pivdennyi port started operating on July 27, 1978, when the Bulduri gas carrier of the Latvian Shipping Company was moored.

On January 17, 2017, Minister of Infrastructure of Ukraine Volodymyr Omelyan ordered to rename by April 29, 2017, the names of state enterprises, institutions and infrastructure facilities that have symbols of the communist regime, as well as names containing Russism or in non-Ukrainian language. On April 17, 2019, the Cabinet of Ministers of Ukraine renamed the port changing it from "Yuzhnyi" to "Pivdennyi."

In December 2021, Pivdennyi port handled 5.77 million tons of cargo, which was a new monthly record of the port.

Gallery

See also

List of ports in Ukraine
Transport in Ukraine

References

External links 
 Official facebook page

Ports and harbours of the Black Sea
Ports of Odesa Oblast
1978 establishments in Ukraine
Ukrainian Sea Ports Authority